Kansas's 14th Senate district is one of 40 districts in the Kansas Senate. It has been represented by Republican Bruce Givens since 2017; Givens was defeated in the 2020 primary election by Michael Fagg.

Geography
District 14 covers Chautauqua, Coffey, Elk, Greenwood, Wilson, and Woodson Counties and parts of Butler, Cowley, and Montgomery Counties in the Flint Hills to the east of Wichita. Communities in the district include El Dorado, Burlington, Eureka, Neodesha, Fredonia, Sedan, Yates Center, Douglass, Towanda, Howard, and part of Winfield.

The district overlaps with Kansas's 2nd and 4th congressional districts, and with the 12th, 13th, 75th, 76th, 77th, and 79th districts of the Kansas House of Representatives. It borders the state of Oklahoma.

Recent election results

2020

2016

2012

Federal and statewide results in District 14

References

14
Butler County, Kansas
Chautauqua County, Kansas
Coffey County, Kansas
Cowley County, Kansas
Elk County, Kansas
Greenwood County, Kansas
Montgomery County, Kansas
Wilson County, Kansas
Woodson County, Kansas